is a 2008 Japanese pink film directed by Kunihiko Matsuoka and starring Rinako Hirasawa and Minami Aoyama. It won the Silver Prize at the Pink Grand Prix ceremony and Takashi Naha won Best Actor, 2nd place for his performance in the film.

Cast
 Rinako Hirasawa: Nana Mochizuki
 Minami Aoyama: Emi Nakagawa
 Azusa Sakai: Yōko Nakagawa
 Keisuke Iba: Tanehiko Yoda
 世志: Keizō Akao
 Takashi Naha: Shirō Nakagawa

Bibliography

References

2008 films
2000s Japanese-language films
Pink films
2000s pornographic films
2000s Japanese films